The Kayan River is a river of Borneo island, flowing in the North Kalimantan province of Indonesia, about 1600 km northeast of the capital Jakarta. Tributaries include the Bahau River.

Hydrology 

Uses

Transportation 
For ages the Kayan River served as a main transportation route for the inhabitants of Malinau and Bulungan Regency to reach the inland region of Malinau Regency using traditional boats or out of the Bulungan Regency using speed boats, while at the downstream there are some river ports for passengers and goods, such as Port of Kayan and Port of Pesawan.

Fishery and agriculture
The people along the Kayan River utilize the water for agriculture and fishery, either by traditional fishing or netting, especially in the upstream area, whereas about 30,000 hectare land of the Delta Kayan is used as Food Estate area, for fish ponds and farmlands.

Hydroelectricity
The Kayan River is used to produce hydroelectricity using some power plants, such as the Diesel-powered one in village of Long Nawang, Kayan Hulu subdistrict. The river can produce around 900 Megwatts (MW). There is also a dam for Hydroelectric Power Plant in the village of Desa Long Peso, Peso subdistrict, Bulungan Regency.

Villages along the Kayan River

Antutan 
Antutan village (Bahasa Indonesia – Desa Antutan) is one of the many villages situated along the Kayan River. The population of the village compromises of Dayak sub-tribes: the Kenyah and the Kayan, also the Tidung and the Bulungan. There are several main sources of income in this village, such as paddy plantation, farming, fishing and crafts selling. Majority of the villagers heavily depended on the paddy rice plantation to make a living. However, some are also public servants, for example, teachers, nurses, armies and police.

See also
List of rivers of Indonesia
List of rivers of Kalimantan

References

Rivers of North Kalimantan
Rivers of Indonesia